Zhang Wu (born 17 August 1993) is a Chinese footballer currently playing as a midfielder for Wuxi Wugou in the China League Two.

Career statistics

Club

Notes

References

1993 births
Living people
Chinese footballers
Chinese expatriate footballers
Association football midfielders
Serbian First League players
China League Two players
FK Trayal Kruševac players
Chinese expatriate sportspeople in Serbia
Expatriate footballers in Serbia
Footballers from Liaoning